is a Japanese video game designer, illustrator, manga artist, and director. He is best known as the primary character designer and art director for the Pokémon franchise. Sugimori is also credited with the art direction for other titles, including Pulseman. Sugimori drew and finalized all of the original 151 Pokémon. He has also worked on the various Pokémon films, trading cards, and other games like the Super Smash Bros. series.

Career
From early 1981 until 1986, Sugimori illustrated a gaming fanzine called Game Freak, which had been started by Satoshi Tajiri. Sugimori discovered the magazine in a dōjinshi shop, and decided to get involved. Eventually, the two decided to pitch an arcade game design idea to Namco; they reworked Game Freak into a development company and produced Mendel Palace. Sugimori is best known as the character designer and art director for the Pokémon franchise and designed a large majority of the first 151 Pokémon with Atsuko Nishida, Motofumi Fujiwara, Shigeki Morimoto, Rena Yoshikawa, and Satoshi Ota. He has worked on the various Pokémon movies, trading cards, and other games.

For Pokémon Black and White, Sugimori directed a team of 17 people in designing new characters for the games, though he always drew the final designs. He drew much of his inspiration from observing animals in aquariums and zoos. Sugimori has also written and illustrated original manga, including one which was distributed with pre-orders of Pokémon Mystery Dungeon: Explorers of Time and Explorers of Darkness. When he begins a new character, his process normally involves making a rough sketch, then tracing it onto film paper while polishing it and making the illustration more professional looking. After that, he draws the character many times, changing its proportions until he is satisfied. When designing a new Pokémon, Sugimori stated that "I do feel that I always want to show new Pokémon that people have never seen before. To do that, I think of ways that I can surprise the players."

Works

Video games
 Pokémon series: art director and character designer (1996-present)
 Mendel Palace: character design
 Yoshi: graphic design
 Smart Ball: game design, story, character design
 Jelly Boy 2 (canceled game): character designer
 Drill Dozer: director and game design
 Magical Tarurūto-kun: director and game design, graphics design
 Pulseman: director and game design, graphics
 BUSHI Seiryūden Futari no Yūsya: character design
 Bazaar de Gosāru no Game de Gosāru: graphics
 Click Medic: graphics support
 Tembo the Badass Elephant: advisor
 Sakura Wars (2019): guest character design
 Little Town Hero: supervisor

Card games
 Pokémon Trading Card Game: main card artist

Anime
 Pokémon (anime): character design
 Pokémon: The First Movie: original character design
 Pokémon: The Movie 2000: original character design
 Pokémon 3: The Movie: conceptual character artist
 Pokémon 4Ever: conceptual character artist
 Pokémon Heroes: conceptual character artist

Manga
 Quinty (Mendel Palace)
 Jerry Boy (Smart Ball)
 Valkyrie no Bōken Gaiden: Futari no Megami (The Adventure of Valkyrie Gaiden: Two Goddess)
 Screw Breaker Gōshin Dorirurero (Drill Dozer)
 Pokémon Fushigi no Danjon Toki no Tankentai Yami no Tankentai (Pokémon Mystery Dungeon: Explorers of Time and Explorers of Darkness)
 Shin Maido Osawagaseshimasu

References

External links
 Sugimori's blog  
 Sugimori's Twitter account (mostly Japanese)

Pokémon
Nintendo people
People from Fukuoka
1966 births
Living people
Japanese art directors
Manga artists
Japanese illustrators